Phillips School serves families from Howard County, Maryland, It is not affiliated with the Howard County Public School System.

School History
In 1967, the School for Contemporary education is founded by Larkin Phillips to work with children and youth with cognitive, emotional, social learning or behavioral challenges. Phillips School for contemporary education moved to the Laurel facility from Baltimore 1994 in the former headquarters of High's Dairy, built by Clifford Y. Stephens in 1961 which was split off from the adjacent Nestlé ice cream plant. In 2014, the adjacent historic Duvall Farm was rezoned from agricultural to transit-oriented development, allowing high volume trucking operations across from the school to accommodate Coastal Sunbelt Produce.

Renovation
A expansion of the facility was built in 1998.

Notable alumni
Steven Dobbin - Artist

References and notes

External links

Private schools in Howard County, Maryland
Educational institutions established in 1994
1952 establishments in Maryland
Buildings and structures in Laurel, Maryland